Széchenyi fürdő is a station of the yellow M1 (Millennium Underground) line of the Budapest Metro, located below the Széchenyi Medicinal Bath. The station was opened on 2 May 1896 as the eastern terminus of the inaugural section of the Budapest Metro, between Vörösmarty tér and Széchenyi fürdő. This section, known as the Millennium Underground Railway, was the first metro system in continental Europe. In 2002, it was included into the World Heritage Site "Budapest, including the Banks of the Danube, the Buda Castle Quarter and Andrássy Avenue". On 30 December 1973, the line was extended to Mexikói út.

Connection
Trolleybus: 72M

References

M1 (Budapest Metro) stations
Railway stations opened in 1896
1896 establishments in Hungary